This page lists the city flags in Africa. It is a part of the Lists of city flags, which is split into continents due to its size.

Algeria

Angola

Historical

Benin

Botswana

Cape Verde

Democratic Republic of the Congo

Egypt

Equatorial Guinea

Eritrea

Eswatini

Ethiopia

Gabon

Gambia

Ghana

Guinea-Bissau

Ivory Coast

Kenya

Libya

Mali

Mauritius

Morocco

Mozambique

Namibia

Nigeria

Republic of the Congo

Rwanda

São Tomé and Príncipe

Somalia

Somaliland

South Africa

Historical

South Sudan

Tanzania

Tunisia

Zambia

Zimbabwe

Historical

See also 
 List of city flags in Asia
 List of city flags in Europe
 List of city flags in North America
 List of city flags in Oceania
 List of city flags in South America

Notes

References

External links 
 Angola: Municipal flags of Angola by Flags of the World.
 Benin: Municipal flags of Benin by Flags of the World.
 Botswana: Municipal flags of Botswana by Flags of the World.
 Cape Verde: Municipal flags of Cape Verde by Flags of the World.
 Democratic Republic of Congo: Municipal and provincial flags of the Democratic Republic of Congo by Flags of the World.
 Guinea-Bissau: Municipal flags of Guinea-Bissau by Flags of the World.
 Kenya: City flags of Kenya by Flags of the World.
 Lebanon: Municipal flags of Lebanon by Flags of the World.
 Madagascar: City flags of Madagascar by Flags of the World.
 Mauritius: Municipal flags of Mauritius by Flags of the World.
 Mozambique: Municipal flags of Mozambique by Flags of the World.
 Namibia: Municipal flags of Namibia by Flags of the World.
 São Tomé and Príncipe: City flags of São Tomé and Príncipe by Flags of the World.
 South Africa: Municipal flags of South Africa by Flags of the World.
 Zimbabwe: Municipal flags of Zimbabwe by Flags of the World.